The Clausura 2019 Copa MX Final was the final of the Clausura 2019 Copa MX, the fourteenth edition of the Copa MX under its current format and 81st overall organized by the Mexican Football Federation, the governing body of association football in Mexico.

The final was contested in a single-leg format between Ascenso MX club Juárez and Liga MX club América. The match was hosted by Juárez at Estadio Olímpico Benito Juárez in Ciudad Juárez on 10 April 2019.

This was the third time a Liga MX and Ascenso MX face each other in the final; FC Juárez is the fifth Ascenso MX club overall to reach the final.

América won the match 1–0 and captured their record sixth title. As winners, América earned the right to face Cruz Azul in the 2019 Supercopa MX. However, they also won the Apertura 2018 Liga MX, and thus qualified for the 2019 Campeón de Campeones. They were replaced by the Supercopa MX title holders, Necaxa.

Qualified teams

Venue
Due to the tournament's regulations, the higher seed among both finalists during the group stage will host the final, thus Estadio Olímpico Benito Juárez will host the final. The venue which opened on 12 May 1981 has been home to FC Juárez since its inaugural season. The venue has previously hosted various Ascenso MX finals, most recently in the Apertura 2017 season when Juárez lost to Oaxaca on penalty kicks. The stadium was also home to Ciudad Juárez's previous football franchises, Cobras de Ciudad Juárez (1985–2005) and Indios de Ciudad Juárez (2005–2011), both of which at one point played in Mexico top-flight football league.

Background
Juárez had never won the tournament while América had won it a record five times. Before reaching this final, the last time Juárez reached a reached a final of any kind was the Apertura 2017 Ascenso MX final where they lost to Oaxaca on penalty kicks. América last reached a final the previous December where they defeated Cruz Azul 2–0 on aggregate to capture their record thirteenth league title.

Juárez won three, drew one, lost none and scored seven goals during the group stage, as they were seeded second. They eliminated León on penalty kicks in the Round of 16, Veracruz on penalty kicks in the quarterfinals and UNAM in the semifinals.

América won three, drew none, lost one and scored six goals during the group stage, as they were seeded fourth. They eliminated Pachuca in the Round of 16, their arch-rivals Guadalajara in the quarterfinals and Tijuana in the semifinals.

Road to the finals
Note: In all results below, the score of the finalist is given first.

Match

Broadcasters

References

Copa MX Finals
2018–19 in Mexican football
2019 in Mexican sports
Club América matches
FC Juárez